The 2010 St. Paul Cash Spiel was held at the St. Paul Curling Club in St. Paul, Minnesota from October 15–17, 2010 as a part of the World Curling Tour. The tournament included 24 teams participating in round-robin play, and included 8 playoff games. The purse is US$13,500. The event was unusual among WCT events, as there were two women's teams, Aileen Sormunen's rink and the Kimberly Wapola rink.

Teams

Round robin

Standings

Results

Draw 1
Friday, October 15, 10:00 am

Draw 2
Friday, October 15, 12:30 pm

Draw 3
Friday, October 15, 3:30 pm

Draw 4
Friday, October 15, 6:00 pm

Draw 5
Friday, October 15, 9:00 pm

Draw 6
Saturday, October 16, 8:00 am

Draw 7
Saturday, October 16, 10:30 am

Draw 8
Saturday, October 16, 1:30 pm

Draw 9
Saturday, October 16, 4:30 pm

Draw 10
Saturday, October 16, 7:00 pm

Playoffs

Quarterfinals
Sunday, October 17, 9:00 am

Semifinals
Sunday, October 17, 12:00 pm

Final
Sunday, October 17, 2:30 pm

External links
Official Site 

St Paul Cash Spiel, 2010
Curling in Minnesota
2010 in sports in Minnesota